Richard Harrison Lane (June 28, 1927 – September 5, 2018) was an American professional baseball player and a former Major League Baseball left fielder. He was born in Highland Park, Michigan. He appeared in 12 games for the Chicago White Sox during the middle of the  season (June 20–July 8), making his major league debut against the Washington Senators at Griffith Stadium.

In 42 at bats Lane hit just .119 (5-for-42...all singles) with four runs batted in and four runs scored. Five walks, however, pushed his on-base percentage up to .213. Lane handled 27 chances for a fielding percentage of 1.000.  Four of his five MLB hits, and three of his four RBIs, came during his first three big league games against Washington, June 22–24. Lane attended the University of Detroit Mercy and his professional career lasted four seasons (1945; 1947–1949).

See also
 Chicago White Sox all-time roster

References

External links
Baseball Reference

1927 births
2018 deaths
Baseball players from Michigan
Chicago White Sox players
Greensboro Patriots players
Greenville Bucks players
Major League Baseball left fielders
Memphis Chickasaws players
Muskegon Clippers players
Newark Bears (IL) players
Syracuse Chiefs players